Cherry Bounce is a type of liqueur made by infusing brandy with sour Morello cherries and sugar. Some recipes use rum, whiskey or vodka instead of brandy.

Origins and etymology 
The English hamlet of Frithsden claims to have originated the Cherry Bounce. A lane leading off the Old High Street in nearby Hemel Hempstead is named Cherry Bounce and is shown having had this name in maps dating back to the early 19th century. The drink, however, is at least a century older. "Cherrybounce" is recorded as an individual's nickname in a House of Lords report in 1670.

The name of the drink may derive from an 18th century definition of the term bounce which meant a "sharp blow". The name of the drink would thus impart a meaning similar to the modern term "shot".

Preparation and history 
Early English recipes called for the use of brandy, while later recipes introduced substitutions for both the alcohol and sweetener used.

The liqueur, which is popular in parts of the United States, also has a long history there. A recipe for it was found among the papers of Martha Washington. This recipe called for whiskey and is said to have been one of George Washington's favorite drinks. The moonshine producer Amos Owens, known as the "Cherry Bounce King", famously purchased land on Cherry Mountain, North Carolina where he distilled Cherry Bounce in large volumes until around 1900.

See also 
 Cherry juice

References

Cherry liqueurs and spirits